Branislav Mojićević (born 20 August 1986) is a Serbian singer. He rose to fame in 2004, after winning the first season of Zvezde Granda, which earned him a record deal with Grand Production.

In addition, Mojićević also won the second season of the Serbian version of Your Face Sounds Familiar in 2014.

He married Serbian bellydancer Milica Mićević in 2013.

Discography 
Studio albums
 Stara ljubav (2005)
 Zlato moje (2008)

References

External links
Official profile on Klub Muzičara Bane Mojićević

1986 births
Living people
Musicians from Čačak
Serbian folk-pop singers
Grand Production artists
Serbian baritones
Your Face Sounds Familiar winners
Indexi Award winners
Beovizija contestants